, better known by her stage name Ray, is a Japanese singer and radio personality from Hokkaido. She signed to Geneon Universal Entertainment.

Biography
Ray was born in Sapporo and raised in Otaru, Hokkaido. Ray originally worked as a gravure idol, performing at a singing audition event sponsored by Avex and Usen called a-motion2007, and releasing a DVD called Peach Collection and a second DVD called Pure Smile in 2008. She tried out for the All-Japan Anime Song Grand Prix in 2010. She also covered songs under the moniker .

She made her debut as a singer in 2012, performing the opening theme song "Sign" for the anime Waiting in the Summer. Her second single  was released on October 24, 2012, which is used as the opening theme to the 2012 anime television series To Love-Ru Darkness. Her third single "Recall" was released on February 6, 2013, which is used as the ending theme to the 2013 anime television series Amnesia.

On a blog post posted on January 25, 2017, Ray announced her retirement from singing to pursue other unspecified activities.

Discography

Albums

Singles

Other album appearances

Appearances

Television 
 Anime-TV (studio guest: December 29, 2011 and February 16, 2012)
 Anipara Ongakukan (live guest: March 30, 2012)

Radio 
 A&G Artist Zone 2h (Tuesday host: January 3, 2012 – )
 A&G Chō Radio Show: Anisupa! (guest: January 28, 2012)
 Radio Rondo Robe (guest: February 3, 2012)
 Nonko to Nobita no Anime Scramble (guest: February 24, 2012)
 Kawada Mami no Attack Young (guest: November 14, 2012)

References

External links
  
  
  
 Ray at Oricon 

1990 births
Living people
Japanese radio personalities
Musicians from Sapporo
People from Otaru
NBCUniversal Entertainment Japan artists
Anime singers
21st-century Japanese singers
21st-century Japanese women singers